Arthur Biyarslanov (born 22 April 1995) is a Canadian professional boxer of Chechen descent. As an amateur, he won a gold medal at the 2015 Pan American Games as well as representing Canada at the 2016 Summer Olympics.

Early life
Biyarslanov's family left Chechnya when he was four years old due to ongoing violence. He migrated to Toronto from Azerbaijan at age 10 and started boxing in 2007 after his brother recommended the sport for self-defense.

Amateur career

Olympic result
Rio 2016
Round of 32: Defeated Obada Al-Kasbeh (Jordan) 3–0
Round of 16: Defeated by Artem Harutyunyan (Germany) 2–0

World Championship results
Doha 2015
Round of 32: Defeated by Lorenzo Sotomayor (Azerbaijan) 3–0

Hamburg 2017
Round of 32: Defeated Evaldas Petrauskas (Lithuania) 3-0
Round of 16: Defeated by Elvis Rodriguez (Dominican Republic) 3–2

Pan American Games result
Toronto 2015
Quarter-finals: Defeated Lucas Gimenez (Argentina) 3–0
Semi-finals: Defeated Luis Arcon (Venezuela) 3–0
Final: Defeated Yasniel Toledo (Cuba) 2–1

Professional career
On 15 December 2018, Biyarslanov made his professional debut against the Mexican  Ernesto Cardona Sanchez. Biyarslanov won the fight in the opening round after trapping Sanchez against the ropes and landing a combination of punches to the head and body which sent his opponent to the canvas. On 9 February 2019, Biyarslanov fought in his second professional fight against Issac Castan. Biyarslanov secured his second professional win after knocking his opponent down three times in the opening round.

On 29 March 2019, it was announced that Biyarslanov had signed a deal with Matchroom Sport where he would be promoted by Eddie Hearn. On 20 April 2019, Biyarslanov fought against the experienced Cristian Arrazola. In the first round, Biyarslanov landed a combination of punches which forced his opponent to take a knee; Arrazola beat the count but was immediately put back on the canvas by a right hand. Arrazola beat the count again but referee Mark Simmons stopped the bout at the end of the opening round after he deemed Arrazola unfit to carry on.

Professional boxing record

References

External links

 
 
 
 
 

1995 births
Living people
Sportspeople from Makhachkala
Canadian male boxers
Olympic boxers of Canada
Boxers at the 2016 Summer Olympics
Pan American Games gold medalists for Canada
Pan American Games medalists in boxing
Boxers at the 2015 Pan American Games
Boxers at the 2014 Commonwealth Games
Light-welterweight boxers
Medalists at the 2015 Pan American Games
Commonwealth Games competitors for Canada